The siege of Hubat was a military campaign carried out by Abu Bakr ibn Muhammad, sultan of Adal Sultanate, against the Hubat principality. 

The siege lasted more than a week in which Hubat leader Garad Umar Din would lose his life, resulting in a victory for Sultan Abu Bakr. However the future leader of Adal, Ahmad ibn Ibrahim al-Ghazi evaded capture.

References

Adal Sultanate 
Wars involving the states and peoples of Africa 
Military history of Africa